Rick Decker is the name of:

Rick Decker (As the World Turns), a fictional character on the television series As the World Turns
Rick Decker (racing driver) (1903–1966), automobile racer who competed in the Indianapolis 500, 1929–1934